Blackwell Consolidated Independent School District is a public school district based in Blackwell, Texas, United States. The district serves southeastern Nolan County, southwestern Taylor County, and a small portion of northeastern Coke County. The district has one high school, Blackwell High School.

History
The district expanded in size on September 1, 1985 since the Divide Independent School District (not the same as the district in Kerr County, Texas) consolidated into it. The name changed from the Blackwell Independent School District to Blackwell CISD as a result of the consolidation.

Finances
As of the 2010–2011 school year, the appraised valuation of property in the district was $274,015,000. The maintenance tax rate was $0.104 and the bond tax rate was $0.007 per $100 of appraised valuation.

Academic achievement
In 2011, the school district was rated "academically acceptable" by the Texas Education Agency.  No state accountability ratings were given to districts in 2012.

Schools
Blackwell Consolidated ISD has two campuses - Blackwell High School (grades 7-12) and Blackwell Elementary (grades prekindergarten-6).

Special programs

Athletics
Blackwell High School plays six-man football.

See also

List of school districts in Texas 
List of high schools in Texas

References

External links 
Blackwell ISD

School districts in Nolan County, Texas
School districts in Taylor County, Texas
School districts in Coke County, Texas
School districts established in 1985